Angelo Mancuso may refer to:
 Angelo Mancuso (American politician)
 Angelo Mancuso (Italian politician)